Clubiona lutescens is a species of sac spider in the family Clubionidae. It is found in Europe, Turkey, Caucasus, a range from Russia to Kazakhstan, Korea, Japan, and has been introduced into North America.

References

External links

 

Clubionidae
Articles created by Qbugbot
Spiders described in 1851